My Sister's Keeper may refer to:

Novels 
 My Sister's Keeper, 1961 novel by Ronald Verlin Cassill
 My Sister's Keeper, 1970 novel by L. P. Hartley
 My Sister's Keeper, 1979 novel by Rachel Lindsay (Roberta Leigh), also named Janey Scott
 My Sister's Keeper (novel), 2004 novel by Jodi Picoult
 My Sister's Keeper, 2005 novel of the Journey of the Sacred King series by Janrae Frank

Films 
 My Sister's Keeper (TV film), 2002 television movie, directed by Ron Lagomarsino, and starring Kathy Bates and Hallee Hirsh
 My Sister's Keeper (film), 2009 film adaptation of the Jodi Picoult novel

Episodes 
 "My Sister's Keeper" (That Girl), 1969
 "My Sister's Keeper" (Three's Company), 1978
 "My Sister's Keeper" (Blossom), 1991
 "My Sister's Keeper" (Digimon Adventure), 2000
 "My Sister's Keeper" (The Listener), 2009
 "My Sister's Keeper" (The Suite Life on Deck), 2010
 "My Sister's Keeper", 2010 episode of Love That Girl!

Other uses 
 My Sister's Keeper, non-governmental organization; see Eleanor Roosevelt Award for Human Rights

See also 
 My Brother's Keeper (disambiguation)
 "Not My Sister's Keeper", episode of Zeke and Luther